Ilmari Kianto (7 May 1874 – 27 April 1970), also known as Ilmari Calamnius and Ilmari Iki-Kianto, was a Finnish author. He was born in Pulkkila, Northern Ostrobothnia, and is best known for his books Punainen viiva ("The Red Line", published 1909) and Ryysyrannan Jooseppi (published in 1924). In his books, he describes people and living at Suomussalmi municipality in Kainuu region. He died in Helsinki, aged 95. Composer Jean Sibelius used Kianto's poem 'Lastu lainehilla' (Driftwood) as the lyric for the last of his Seven Songs, Op.17 (1902).

Kianto's books have also been adapted into films, most notably the 1955 film  directed by Roland af Hällström and the 1959 film The Red Line directed by Matti Kassila. In the year 1978 composer Aulis Sallinen made a libretto based on Kianto´s novel and composed an opera The Red Line.

References

External links

 
 Ilmari Kianto -seura ry 
 Text of 'Lastu lainehilla' 

1874 births
1970 deaths
People from Siikalatva
People from Oulu Province (Grand Duchy of Finland)
Writers from Northern Ostrobothnia
Finnish male poets